Jugumella is a genus of extinct plants of the Late Silurian (around ). Fossils were found in Kazakhstan. Jugumella was considered a possible zosterophyll in a 2006 study. It was listed as a zosterophyll by Hao and Xue in 2013.

References

Silurian plants
Prehistoric lycophyte genera
Zosterophylls